Bad Boy South was a southern hip hop spin-off label of Bad Boy Records. The label was founded by Sean Combs in 2003.

History
Bad Boy South was founded in 2003 after this signing of 8 Ball & MJG. The label was created to capitalize on the success of southern hip hop and to have one label simply focus on that genre so that the mainstream label could go out and search for other talents. For the first year, 8 Ball & MJG were the only artists on the label.

In 2005, the label signed a deal with Russell "Block" Spencer to cross-promote artists on his label, Block Entertainment. This deal added acts Boyz n da Hood, Gorilla Zoe, Big Gee, Jody Breeze, Duke, and Young Jeezy. Jeezy would leave the label before the group could release their debut album, which sparked controversy as he would start his own label and sign with The Island Def Jam Music Group.

In late 2005, the label would sign Yung Joc, who would quickly become the face of the rising label. In 2006, his debut album New Joc City would take the label to new heights as it would become the label's first Platinum release.

In 2007, the label debuted Boyz n da Hood artist Gorilla Zoe, who became one of the more popular acts on the label. His hit single, "Hood Nigga", would propel his album to a Gold certification. He and Yung Joc both became the label's main two artists. 2007's other release was Joc's Hustlenomics, with his hit "Coffee Shop" with Gorilla Zoe. The label's first act 8 Ball & MJG released their second album for the label, Ridin High. Yung Joc was later released from Bad Boy Records.

Artists 
 Gorilla Zoe
 Don Trip 
 MarVo 
 YC
 Jody Breeze (Solo Deal with Sho'nuff Records)
 Yung Joc
 Chopper "Young City"
 Young Jeezy
 8 Ball & MJG
 Big Duke
Jacquees

Discography

References

External links 
 Bad Boy South Online

Record labels established in 2003
American record labels
Hip hop record labels